Myke Halkema (born 29 July 1994) is a Dutch badminton player, specializing in doubles play. She won a silver medal at the 2013 European Junior Badminton Championships in mixed doubles and a bronze medal in mixed team.

Achievements

European Junior Championships 
Mixed doubles

BWF International Challenge/Series 
Women's doubles

Mixed doubles

  BWF International Challenge tournament
  BWF International Series tournament
  BWF Future Series tournament

References

External links 
 

1994 births
Living people
Dutch female badminton players
21st-century Dutch women